Desmond Williams (born 11 April 1967) is a Sierra Leonean boxer. He competed in the men's light middleweight event at the 1988 Summer Olympics.

References

External links
 

1967 births
Living people
Sierra Leonean male boxers
Olympic boxers of Sierra Leone
Boxers at the 1988 Summer Olympics
Place of birth missing (living people)
Light-middleweight boxers
Sierra Leone Creole people